This is a list of Croatian football transfers in the 2016 summer transfer window by club. Only clubs in the Hrvatski Telekom Prva liga are included.

Croatian First Football League

Cibalia

In:

Out:

Dinamo Zagreb

In:

Out:

Hajduk Split

In:

Out:

Inter Zaprešić

In:

Out:

Istra 1961

In:

Out:

Lokomotiva

In:

Out:

Osijek

In:

Out:

Rijeka

In:

Out:

Rudeš

In:

Out:

Slaven Belupo

In:

Out:

References

Transfers
Croatia
2017
2016–17 in Croatian football